Elkins School District is a public school district based in Elkins, Arkansas, United States. Established in 1898, the Elkins School District provides early childhood, elementary and secondary education for more than 1,200 kindergarten through grade 12 students at its four facilities.

The district includes the majority of Elkins.

List of Schools 
 Elkins High School—grades 9 through 12.
 Elkins Middle School—grades 7 through 8.
 Elkins Elementary School—grades 3 through 6.
 Elkins Elementary Primary School—kindergarten through grade 2.

References

External links 
 

School districts in Arkansas
Education in Washington County, Arkansas
1898 establishments in Arkansas
School districts established in 1898